Diego Marcelo Osella (born September 4, 1969) is a retired Argentine professional basketball player.

Professional career
Osella was the Argentine League Finals MVP in 1999.

National team career
With the senior Argentine national basketball team, Osella competed at the 1996 Summer Olympic Games in Atlanta, Georgia, where his team finished in ninth place in the overall-rankings. A year earlier, he helped claim Argentina's first ever gold medal in senior men's basketball, at the 1995 Pan American Games, after defeating the United States in the final, in Mar del Plata, Argentina.

Titles

Clubs
 Liga Nacional de Básquet: 1988, 1990, 1991–92, 1997–98, 1998–99, 2008–09
 Campeonato Sudamericano de Clubes: 1993, 1994
 Campeonato Panamericano de Clubes: 1996
 Liga Sudamericana de Clubes: 1997, 1998, 2004
All club championships were won playing with Atenas.

National team
 Sudamericano Juvenil: 1988
 Pan American Games gold medal: 1995
 Sudamericano Mayores gold medal: 2001

Personal honours
Liga Nacional de Básquet Statistical Leaders:
 Most games played in the Liga Nacional at the time he retired (1,096) 
 Most rebounds in the Liga Nacional (6,804).
 Most blocks in the Liga Nacional (989).
 5th all-time top scorer in the Liga Nacional (12,358).
 Number 11 jersey retired by Atenas: (2011)

References

External links
Number 11 retirement video at BasketBlog.com 

1969 births
Living people
1998 FIBA World Championship players
Argentine expatriate basketball people in Spain
Argentine men's basketball players
1990 FIBA World Championship players
Atenas basketball players
Basketball players at the 1995 Pan American Games
Basketball players at the 1996 Summer Olympics
CB Lucentum Alicante players
Centers (basketball)
Estudiantes de Olavarría basketball players
Juventud Sionista basketball players
Liga ACB players
Olympic basketball players of Argentina
Pallacanestro Varese players
Pan American Games gold medalists for Argentina
Pan American Games medalists in basketball
Sportspeople from Córdoba Province, Argentina
Medalists at the 1995 Pan American Games
1994 FIBA World Championship players